IC 1919 is an elliptical galaxy in the constellation of Fornax. It is 61 million light years distant from Earth and it is a member of Fornax Cluster, a cluster of approximately 200 galaxies.

It was discovered by Lewis Swift on November 25, 1897. Its diameter, based on distance and size on night sky, is 23 000 light years, which is only a one quarter or probably less the diameter of Milky Way Galaxy.

See also 
IC 1913
NGC 1399, central galaxy of Fornax Cluster
NGC 1427A

References 

Elliptical galaxies
1919
Fornax (constellation)